Hugh Cecil Lea (27 May 1869 – 29 January 1926) was a British Liberal Party politician and newspaper proprietor.

Background
He was a son of Carl Adolph Lea and Elizabeth Maria Matthews. He was educated in Boulogne, Reims and Munich.

Career

Lea served in both the Oxfordshire and Buckinghamshire Light Infantry and the United States Army. He was on the London staff of The African Review. He owned The Wine and Spirit Trade Record.

Lea was Liberal MP for St Pancras East from 1906 to 1910. Standing for parliament for the first time, he gained the seat from the Conservative at the 1906 General Election. He only served one parliamentary term before standing down at the General Election of January 1910. He did not stand for parliament again. He was a Member of London County Council, representing St Pancras East for the Liberal Party backed Progressives from 1910 to 1913.

Lea died after a short illness at the age of 56. He is buried in Hampstead Cemetery.

References

Sources

External links
Who's Who

1869 births
1926 deaths
Liberal Party (UK) MPs for English constituencies
UK MPs 1906–1910
Members of London County Council
Progressive Party (London) politicians